Roy Spencer may refer to:

 Roy Spencer (meteorologist), American meteorologist and research scientist
 Roy Spencer (baseball) (1900–1973), American Major League Baseball catcher
 Roy Spencer (actor),  British actor, special effects technician, and author